Erald Dervishi (born 10 November 1979) is an Albanian chess grandmaster. He is a two-time Albanian Chess Champion.

Chess career
Born in 1979, Dervishi won the Albanian Chess Championship in 1996 and 1997. He earned his grandmaster title in 1998, becoming the first Albanian to achieve the title. He was awarded the Grand Master of Work Order by Albanian President Bujar Nishani in May 2017. In 2017, he won the 5th Francophonie Championship with a score of 7.5/9.

He is the No. 1 ranked Albanian player as of July 2022.

References

External links

1979 births
Living people
Albanian chess players
Chess grandmasters
Sportspeople from Durrës